Emanuel Kolkki (22 November 1869, Kuru - 17 March 1940) was a Finnish Lutheran clergyman and politician. He was a member of the Parliament of Finland, representing the Finnish Party from 1907 to 1909 and the National Coalition Party from 1930 to 1933.

References

1869 births
1940 deaths
People from Ylöjärvi
People from Häme Province (Grand Duchy of Finland)
20th-century Finnish Lutheran clergy
Finnish Party politicians
National Coalition Party politicians
Members of the Parliament of Finland (1907–08)
Members of the Parliament of Finland (1908–09)
Members of the Parliament of Finland (1930–33)
University of Helsinki alumni
19th-century Finnish Lutheran clergy